The Shire of Mukinbudin is a local government area in the Wheatbelt region of Western Australia, about  north of Merredin and about  east of the state capital, Perth.

History
Initially, Mukinbudin was governed by the Merredin Road District, and then from 1921 the Nungarin Road District.

The Shire of Mukinbudin originated as the Mukinbudin Road District, established with effect from 1 November 1933, having separated from Nungarin due to a growing population. Its first election was held on 18 November 1933, and Thomas Basil Conway was elected its inaugural chairman at its first meeting.

On 1 July 1961, it became a Shire following the passage of the Local Government Act 1960, which reformed all remaining road districts into shires.

Towns and localities
The towns and localities of the Shire of Mukinbudin with population and size figures based on the most recent Australian census:

(* indicates locality is only partially located within this shire)

Population

Heritage-listed places
As of 2023, 37 places are heritage-listed in the Shire of Mukinbudin, of which none are on the State Register of Heritage Places.

References

External links
 

Mukinbudin